Jefferson Davis Parish Public Schools or Jefferson Davis Parish School Board (JDPSB) is a school district headquartered in Jennings, Louisiana, United States.

The district covers Jefferson Davis Parish.

School uniforms
The district requires all students to wear school uniforms.

Schools

K-12 schools
 Hathaway High School  (Unincorporated area)
 Lacassine High School  (Unincorporated area)

6-12 schools
 Elton High School  (Elton)

7-12 schools
 Lake Arthur High School (Unincorporated area)
 Jennings High School  (Jennings)

8-12 schools
 Welsh High School  (Welsh)

PK-8 schools
 Fenton Elementary/Junior High School (Fenton)

6-8 schools
 Welsh-Roanoke Junior High School (Unincorporated area)

PK-6 schools
 Lake Arthur Elementary School (Lake Arthur)

3-6 schools
 Jennings Elementary School (Jennings)

PK-5 schools
 Elton Elementary School (Elton)
 Welsh Elementary School (Welsh)

PK-2 schools
 Ward Elementary School (Jennings)

References

External links
 Jefferson Davis Parish Public Schools

School districts in Louisiana
Education in Jefferson Davis Parish, Louisiana